Charles-Louis Hanon (2 July 181919 March 1900) was a French piano pedagogue and composer. He is best known for his work The Virtuoso Pianist in 60 Exercises, which is still used today for modern piano teaching, but over the years the method has also faced criticisms. He was born in Renescure, France in 1819, and died in Boulogne-sur-Mer in 1900.

Biography
Charles-Louis Hanon was born in northern France in the village of Renescure on July 2, 1819. Trained as an organist by a local teacher, it is not known if he received more advanced musical education. At age 27, he moved a short distance east from Renescure to Boulogne-sur-Mer where he lived with his brother François who was also a musician.

Music was never the exclusive focus of Hanon's life: he was also a devout Roman Catholic, a Third Order Franciscan and a member of the Society of St. Vincent de Paul.

It is known from an 1869 article that Hanon was involved with a monastic order called the "Brothers of the Christian Schools". Founded in the 17th century by Saint John Baptist de la Salle, the schools run by the order provide free instruction to poor children. One such school was established in Boulogne-sur-Mer in approximately 1815 by Léon de Chanlaire and Father Benoît-Agathon Haffreingue; free music instruction was offered there by 1830.

The Virtuoso Pianist

Piano students all over the world know of Hanon's famous training exercises. Both Sergei Rachmaninoff and Josef Lhévinne claimed Hanon to be the secret of why the Russian piano school delivered an explosion of virtuosi in their time, for the Hanon exercises have been obligatory for a long time throughout Russian conservatories; there were special examinations at which one had to know all exercises by heart, to be played in all keys at high speed.

Although most respected pedagogues and pianists acknowledge the value of Hanon's exercises, they have their detractors. Some critics have questioned the merits of the independent finger technique which the exercises seek to cultivate, with some pedagogues, such as Abby Whiteside, considering them to be actively harmful.

It has become a custom in some music schools to hold a Hanon Marathon, in which the exercises are played competitively, the Church Street School for Music and Art being the first to have coined the term and hold the event.

Other works and derivatives
Hanon also wrote 50 instructional pieces, Méthode Élémentaire de Piano, and a collection of 50 Ecclesiastical Chants.
 
Charles Nunzio wrote Hanon for Accordion, a two-volume set of exercises for piano accordion based on a similar philosophy, which has recently been reissued in an updated edition.

A Hanon for guitar and bass have also been written.

See also
Five finger exercise

Sources
Josef Lhévinne - Basic Principles in Pianoforte Playing
James Francis Cooke - Great pianists on piano playing (chapter - Rachmaninov)

References

External links

1819 births
1900 deaths
French music educators
Piano pedagogues
Composers for piano
19th-century French composers